Psalm 72 is the 72nd psalm of the Book of Psalms, beginning in English in the King James Version: "Give the king thy judgments, O God, and thy righteousness unto the king's son". In the slightly different numbering system used in the Greek Septuagint and Latin Vulgate translations of the Bible, this psalm is Psalm 71. In Latin, it is known as "Deus iudicium tuum regi da". Traditionally seen as being written by King Solomon, its heading may be translated 'to or for Solomon'. 

The psalm forms a regular part of Jewish, Catholic, Lutheran, Anglican and other Protestant liturgies. It has been set to music.

Text

King James Version 
 Give the king thy judgments, O God, and thy righteousness unto the king's son.
 He shall judge thy people with righteousness, and thy poor with judgment.
 The mountains shall bring peace to the people, and the little hills, by righteousness.
 He shall judge the poor of the people, he shall save the children of the needy, and shall break in pieces the oppressor.
 They shall fear thee as long as the sun and moon endure, throughout all generations.
 He shall come down like rain upon the mown grass: as showers that water the earth.
 In his days shall the righteous flourish; and abundance of peace so long as the moon endureth.
 He shall have dominion also from sea to sea, and from the river unto the ends of the earth.
 They that dwell in the wilderness shall bow before him; and his enemies shall lick the dust.
 The kings of Tarshish and of the isles shall bring presents: the kings of Sheba and Seba shall offer gifts.
 Yea, all kings shall fall down before him: all nations shall serve him.
 For he shall deliver the needy when he crieth; the poor also, and him that hath no helper.
 He shall spare the poor and needy, and shall save the souls of the needy.
 He shall redeem their soul from deceit and violence: and precious shall their blood be in his sight.
 And he shall live, and to him shall be given of the gold of Sheba: prayer also shall be made for him continually; and daily shall he be praised.
 There shall be an handful of corn in the earth upon the top of the mountains; the fruit thereof shall shake like Lebanon: and they of the city shall flourish like grass of the earth.
 His name shall endure for ever: his name shall be continued as long as the sun: and men shall be blessed in him: all nations shall call him blessed.
 Blessed be the LORD God, the God of Israel, who only doeth wondrous things.
 And blessed be his glorious name for ever: and let the whole earth be filled with his glory; Amen, and Amen.
 The prayers of David the son of Jesse are ended.

Heading 
Lutheran theologian John Brug writes "The heading of Psalm 72 is 'Of Solomon'. This may also be translated 'to or for Solomon'. For this reason some commentators regard this as a Psalm written by David to express his hope for Solomon."

Analysis 
Some commentators see David's prayers as fulfilled in some sense in the reign of Solomon: a temple will be built and there will be great peace and prosperity; yet the language is larger than Solomon. "The whole earth is filled with his glory" (verse 19) is like the angel speaking from Isaiah 6. Matthew Henry sees this fulfillment in some ways in the reign of Solomon but even more in a greater than Solomon to come: "the psalm belongs to Solomon in part, but to Christ more fully and clearly".

Uses

Judaism 
 Verses 18–19 are the third and fourth verses of Baruch Hashem L'Olam in Pesukei Dezimra and Baruch Hashem L'Olam during Maariv.

New Testament 
In the New Testament, verse 18 is quoted in Luke .

Christianity 
The hymn "Jesus shall reign where'er the sun" is a lyrical adaptation of Psalm 72 written by Isaac Watts.

Lutherans use this Psalm to celebrate Epiphany every year and Pentecost 14 of the Inter-Lutheran Commission on Worship's year C. In the Church of England's Book of Common Prayer, this psalm is appointed to be read on the morning of the 14th day of the month.

Canadian National Motto 
The national motto of Canada, A Mari Usque Ad Mare, comes from Psalm 72:8:

Musical settings 
"Reges Tharsis", set to music as a motet by a large number of composers, uses words beginning at verse 10. Heinrich Schütz set Psalm 72 in a metred version in German, "Gott, gib dem König auserkorn", SWV 169, as part of the Becker Psalter, first published in 1628.

References

External links 

 
 
  in Hebrew and English, Mechon-mamre
 Text of Psalm 72 according to the 1928 Psalter
 O God, give your judgment to the king; your justice to the king’s son (text and footnotes) United States Conference of Catholic Bishops
 Psalm 72 – The King and the King of Kings (text and detailed commentary) enduringword.com
 Psalm 72:1 (introduction and text) Bible study tools
 Psalm 72 / Refrain: The Lord is king; let the earth rejoice. Church of England
 Psalm 72 Bible gateway
 Charles H. Spurgeon: Psalm 72 (commentary) spurgeon.org

072
Solomon